Brandon Michael Newton (born July 29, 1994) is an American politician. He is a member of the South Carolina House of Representatives from the 45th District, serving since 2016. He is a member of the Republican party.

Upon his election in 2016, Newton became the youngest member serving in the South Carolina House of Representatives. He was 22 years, 3 months, and 16 days old at the time he took office.

Newton named as an elector for the 2020 presidential election, but was replaced by Theresa "Charm" Altman.

References

Living people
1994 births
Republican Party members of the South Carolina House of Representatives
21st-century American politicians
University of South Carolina alumni
Winthrop University alumni
2020 United States presidential electors